Anna Paradowska is an Australian engineer who is Professor in Advanced Structure Materials at the Australian Centre for Neutron Scattering and the Australian Nuclear Science and Technology Organisation.

Early life and education 
Paradowska completed her master's degree in materials science at Wroclaw University of Technology. She moved to Monash University as a doctoral researcher, where she specialised in mechanical engineering and the development of strategies to study stress in steel welds. After earning her doctorate, she joined the Rutherford Appleton Laboratory working on the ENGIN-X beamline.

Research and career 
In 2011, Paradowska joined the Australian Nuclear Science and Technology Organisation. Paradowska develops neutron and synchrotron diffraction for residual stress analysis. She is interested in the welding process and developed the Kowari–Strain Scanner, looking to understand how the structure and stress in materials relate to they manufacturing process.

Selected publications

References 

Living people
21st-century Australian engineers
Australian women engineers
Australian mechanical engineers
Australian materials scientists
Wrocław University of Technology alumni
Monash University alumni
Year of birth missing (living people)